"Wish You Were Mine" is a 2014 song by Philip George.

Wish You Were Mine may also refer to:

Films
 Kash Aap Hamare Hote (Translation: Wish... You Were Mine) is a 2003 Bollywood musical film

Music
 "Wish You Were Mine", song by Sugar Pie DeSanto Trudy Rhone 1960
 "Wish You Were Mine", song by The-Dream from Terius Nash: 1977 2012
 "Wish You Were Mine", song by Robin Trower from What Lies Beneath (Robin Trower album) 2009
 "Wish You Were Mine", song by John Mayall from Blues from Laurel Canyon 1968
 "Wish You Were Mine", song by Gregory Isaacs Private Beach Party 1985
 "Wish You Were Mine", song by Bobby Vee, B-side to "Hickory, Dick And Doc" Bobby Vee discography 1964
 "Wish That You Were Mine", song by Stephanie Mills from Sweet Sensation 1980